Daniel London (born 1973) is an American actor, best known for his roles in Patch Adams, Rent and Old Joy.

Life and career
Born and raised in Mt. Lebanon, Pennsylvania, London began writing and acting in plays in high school. While a student at Mt. Lebanon High School, from which he graduated in 1991, he had his play The Martha War performed at the Kennedy Center in Washington, D.C.

London attended Oberlin College, in Oberlin, Ohio, where he continued to act while majoring in English. He moved to New York City after his graduation in 1995 to begin his acting career.

London landed one of his first major roles, alongside actor Robin Williams, in the 1998 movie, Patch Adams. He also appeared on stage in two Beth Henley plays. London played Wally, the caretaker of the Pre-Cogs, in Minority Report in 2002. He also starred with Will Oldham in the 2006 movie, Old Joy.

He currently lives in Brooklyn, New York, with his singer/songwriter wife, Megan Reilly.

Filmography

Plays
 Impossible Marriage, by Beth Henley (Roundabout Theatre Company, 1998)
 More Lies About Jerzy, by Davey Holmes (Vineyard Theater, 2001)
 Ridiculous Fraud, by Beth Henley (McCarter Theater, 2006)
 Offices, by Ethan Coen (Atlantic Theater Company, 2009)

References

External links

"Mt. Lebanon High School marks 75 years of theater", Mary Niederberger, Pittsburgh Post-Gazette, South Section, November 17, 2005.
Gabrielli, Betty. Daniel London Races to Stage and Screen. Oberlin Online.edu. 10 November 1998.
"Daniel London Filmography." New York Times.
Irby, Myryah. Interview with Daniel London. New York Times.

1973 births
Living people
Date of birth missing (living people)
Male actors from Pittsburgh
People from Mt. Lebanon, Pennsylvania
20th-century American male actors
21st-century American male actors